In economics, personal income refers to an individual's total earnings from wages, investment enterprises, and other ventures. It is the sum of all the incomes received by all the individuals or household during a given period. Personal income is that income which is received by the individuals or households in a country during the year from all sources. In general, it refers to all products and money that you receive.

Personal income is either the earned income or transferred income which received by households within the county or outside. Also personal income is the total capital that an individual receives from various sources in the course of life for a certain period of time. Personal income can include not only wages, but also a number of additional incomes (for example, dividends on securities, transfers, pensions, social benefits, rent, and so on). Personal income is calculated before deducting personal taxes charged to the subject. Personal income is an indicator that shows the real well-being of people and their ability to pay (before taxes)

Types of personal income

 Nominal personal income (NPI) - refers to the amount of income received from all types of activities. Taxes and mandatory costs are not included. It is mainly about money, that makes a personal budget and that we get on hand.
 Disposable personal income (DPI) – define the amount of money that you actually use.  In other words, it is a nominal income plus all mandatory costs such as rental housing, fees of utilities, etc.
 Real personal income (RPI) – personal income while inflation is taken into account. RPI is useful for calculating fixed payments for an extended period of time.
 RPI = DPI- inflation index

Personal income can also be divided into: 
Earned income money received as a payment for work (bonuses, service fee, etc.). 

 Earned income has these advantages: 
• Payments are predictable and constant;  
• Employers "pay" for your errors.  
• When you make an error at work, your pay is usually not affected.  

Earned income has the following disadvantages:  
• It is conditional (no job = no income)  
• It is the most heavily taxed form of income  
• When you get a raise, so does the government  
• Only a few personal expenses can be deducted "pre-tax"  
• Labor has no residual value, which means that extra effort put in one day does not carry over to the next ... there is always more to do.

 Portfolio income refers to money received by selling assets. The gain from selling assets generated when the price you sell it for is higher than the price you paid for it.

 Advantages of Portfolio Income: 
• You can use other people's time (research/data) and money (leveraged investments or margin trading accounts)  
• You have more control over where and when you invest your time/money than you do with earned income.

Disadvantages of Portfolio Income:
• You pay for errors and blunders  
• Payments are not as steady as earned income  
• Long-Term Capital Gains, Short-Term Capital Gains, and Dividend Taxes are three different tax rates.

 Passive income- income, received without any physical actions from the recipient's side.

Benefits of Passive Income:

• Return on Investment (ROI)
• Passive income can be generated with little or no work after development.

Passive Income's Drawbacks:

• Takes time and effort, and 
• there is no guarantee of how much money one will make.

 Non-Passive income income that requires one's physical participation, but it is not necessarily earned income.

Classification of personal income 
At the present stage, personal income has a complex structure. They can be classified.

The changes in the level of consumer prices 

- Nominal income identify as the amount of capital that a certain person received in a specific period of time. This indicator shows the real level of financial income, regardless of the level of taxes.

- Disposable income refers to the money that belongs to this type of profit can be used for personal tasks and saved as your savings. At the same time, disposable income is usually lower than nominal. This is explained by the need to deduct mandatory payments and taxes from the total amount.

DPI = PI (personal income) – personal tax (income tax)  – non tax payment (fine) 

- Real income shows how many people will be able to purchase goods with the available funds over a certain period of time.

The form of the units 

- Monetary income includes salaries, pensions, business profits, wages at enterprises, and unemployment benefits. This also includes dividends on securities, profit from real estate, interest on deposits, and profit from the sale of agricultural products, income from the sale of currency, insurance payments, and other forms of income

- Natural income such profits include products that are made in the conditions of a subsidiary farm, payments from social funds, services provided by family members, and so on.

3. The intervention of public structures:

- Primary income is generated by a powerful market mechanism.

- Secondary income is inevitably associated with changes in the country's policy.
54,49.00thousands dollars

The relationship between socio-economic and the personal income 
In recent decades, there has been a steadily increasing concern of the economy of the personal and household income, which is considered as a socio-economic unit that bonds people with relationships that arise when organizing their joint life. At the same time, it is an equal economic entity that regulates the consumption of goods created in the economy and provides the social economy with the available resources.

The socio-economic core of personal income has become particularly important in recent years, which coincided with the development of consumer credit. According to E. A. Maznaya, the household should be considered as a system of economic relations between the individual and society (as well as between people who combine their budget and jointly make decisions), created by a person to meet their needs and reproduce their living conditions

Households and personal income aspects 
Personal income (household and family finances) is an economic relationship for the formation and use of monetary funds in order to ensure the material and social conditions of life of members of society and their reproduction. Now there is no doubt that in the conditions of developed market relations, personal Finance is allocated as an independent part of the financial system.

A comprehensive study of this subject is devoted to numerous publications that address such issues as managing and controlling personal expenditures through the use of personal budgets and accounts; skillful distribution of consumption expenditures; planning taxes, insurance payments, medical care and debt repayment; income management and planning for property accumulation and retirement; a reasonable approach to purchases and borrowing; spending on raising children, education, insurance, etc.

The difference in personal income and National income 
Personal income is considered as a part of national income received by households which is the income existed by production aspects. However, National income is caused by production aspects.Personal income is the money received by factors of production, whereas national income is the income generated by them. The government sector's income is included in national income but not in personal income. Companies' undistributed profits and corporate profit taxes are components of national income, but they must be removed from personal income calculations. Windfall games, which are not included in national income, are  included in personal income. Personal income, but not national income, includes interest on the national debt.

Personal income calculation 
PI = Undistributed profits UP  (received by earnings) – Corporate tax CT (received by government) – Net interest  households payment NIH (payment made from households) + Transfer payment from households TPH (received by households)

National income calculation 
The Importance of national income as the main source of income growth and living standards of the population associated with increasing the efficiency of social production

 National income in the system of basic macroeconomic indicators:

the policy of income and wages is a system based on legislation and regulations for the distribution of created national income for personal consumption of the population. As the main source of income growth and living standards of the population, national income, in turn, is a part of the gross national product.

 Gross national product:

the total market value of goods and services produced in a country for a year) is usually considered from two points of view: expenditure and income. As a set of expenditures the gross national product can be represented as the sum of four components :

GNP = Ig + C + G + Xn

(100) = (45) + (40) + (9) + (6),

where GNP (gross national product) - gross national product, GNP (100)

Ig (gross investment) - gross investment, or business investment expenses (45)

C (personal consumption expenditures) – personal consumption expenditures, or consumer expenditures

households (40)

G (government purchases) – government purchases of goods and services, or government expenditures (9)

Xn (net exports) - net exports (exports minus imports) (6)

Sources of personal income
 Wage
 Extra charges (i.e. paid for harmful work)
 Social payments
 Profits from owning real estate (rent)
 Lotteries, prizes
 Dividends
 Unemployment compensation

Usually, we are used to thinking of personal income as of wage only, but as you have already seen, there are more types of personal income. Rent, salary, wages, interest, and profits, for example, account for a significant amount of personal income, as do factors of production such as land, labor, capital, and entrepreneur. Now we'll go over each component one by one.

1. Wages / Salaries: Individuals and households earn 60% of their income through salaries and wages. As a result, wages, salaries, and other labor incomes are the official term for labor in the national income and product accounts.

2. Rent : The rental income earned by each household member is included in the PI. The rent is collected by the owners from the rented homes, land, plant, or equipment. Rent accounts for about 2% to 3% of personal income.

3. Interest : According to the Bureau of Economic Standards' national income and product accounts, the official word for interest as a component of personal income is personal income. Bank accounts, fixed income instruments or bonds, and any other type of loan generate interest. Interest accounts for 10% to 13% of total PI.

4. Profit : Profit is the entrepreneur's part of the company's capital. In the personal income formula, the dividend is the formal entry for profit. In terms of personal income, the dividend ranges from 2% to 4%. Furthermore, there are two types of business profit that are not distributed: retained earnings and corporate taxes on gains.

5. Profits of the proprietor : Owners of sole proprietorships and partnerships do not get wages or salaries. Instead, they are paid a percentage of the league's profits, known as the proprietor's income. It accounts for about 10% of PI.

6. Payment Transfers: The above-mentioned components are the earned and received income. The relative accounts for about 80% to 85% of personal income. Transfer payments account for the remaining 15 percent to 20%. The money received but not generated by the factors of production is referred to as transfer payments. Social security benefits, welfare payments, and unemployment compensation are all examples of transfer payments.

2) The second method involves altering the National Income with income received and earned, as well as income that was not earned but received.

PI = NI + Earned but Unpaid Income + Earned but Unpaid Income

#1 – Earned but unpaid income

Undistributed profits, social security taxes, and corporation taxes are the three largest sources of income that aren't received. Undistributed profits are the business's part of revenues for future business prospects, whereas social security taxes are the contribution given by workers. Finally, firms are responsible for paying corporate taxes on their profits.

#2 –Received but not earned income

Social security benefits, unemployment benefits, and welfare payments are the three main sources of income that are not earned. The government provides these three incomes to the household members. Senior individuals, disabled people, and retirees receive social security benefits.

The government pays unemployment compensation to unemployed members of the household in order to maintain a reasonable quality of life. Finally, the government provides social subsidies to the poorest members of society.

Importance of personal income 
For an average person, personal income reflects its well-being and the conditions in which it lives. The higher the personal income, the higher the welfare and the better the living conditions. Therefore, people tend to increase their personal income in various ways. Rising money does contribute to increased happiness, but it requires people to be hopeful, not have unrealistic expectations, and the typical person to be able to afford more goods. Increases in household income were linked to greater happy moods and improved life assessments.

Personal income tax 
Personal income tax is a tax imposed on income generated by individuals. The government adjusts the tax according to the jurisdiction of a country. For the government, income tax is a source of the government's revenue, that they spend on public goods and services.

It is the most progressive tax; however, there are significant cross-country variations, and social security contributions, consumption taxes, and real estate taxes tend to be regressive in most countries. Also, the tax expenditures pertaining to personal income tax, that are tend to benefit the well-off, and the main exception being in-work tax credits. Besides, the personal income tax is progressive and gross replacement rates are generally below 100%. According to the 2008 OECD data, most of the households surveys are focused on the personal income tax, followed by social security, contributions which are paid by the employees, and sometimes property taxes.

However, despite the cuts in the marginal rates, labour taxes have often become a more progressive tax, and personal income tax schedules have become more flatter over the past decade. Furthermore, despite the cuts in top rates, tax schedule progressively which has increased in a majority of OECD countries since 2000, and largely driven by changes at the lower end of the income distribution. And, to make it more attractive for the spouse and low-paid workers in many countries such as Belgium, Canada, Finland, France, the Netherlands, the Slovak Republic, Sweden, the United Kingdom, and the United States has strengthen in their work benefits targeted at low-income groups, therefore, they incidentally increasing the progressively of the personal-income tax. And, on the tax side, the personal income tax often plays a marginal role in the total tax, and the progressively of labour tax schedule is relatively limited. In contrast, the personal-income tax and social security contributions move in the same direction, especially when the share of taxes of labour decreases, and in some cases the reduction of the share of taxes on labour has achieved through a shift among the three different components. For instance, in the Netherlands had increased the share of social security paid by employers, and France the share of personal-income tax, whereas in Latvia has decreased the share of taxes on labour by compensating an increase in personal income tax and social security paid by employees through significant cuts in employers social security.

Personal income tax revenues are dependent on wages and employment (WtLt), and the rationale of social related expenditure is affecting the personal income taxation, the tax expenditure has long been used as a tool for promoting a social and economic objectives. And, in the US the social tax expenditures are affecting personal income taxation and represent the main part of total tax expenditure in relation to GDP. There are four preferential tax treatment are affecting the personal-income tax, related to housing, pension, education and health expenditure. According to the OECD 2019, there is a rise in tax wedge rates driven by the higher income, and it was the major factor in 20 of the countries of OECD showing an overall increase. And, the largest rise in personal income taxes as a percentage of labour costs was in France (1.36 percentage points), largely due to an increase of 1.7% points in surtax rate; however, the increase in personal-income tax was mostly offset by reduced social security contributions.

Personal benefits of paying income tax 

 Visa applications: If  you want to visit the United States, the United Kingdom, or Canada, you alien must present an Income Tax Return (ITR) for the previous two years in order to get your Visa granted. This is due to the fact that the ITR assists other nations in ensuring that you are not fleeing India to avoid     paying taxes.
 Loan approval: Most large-ticket loans, such as mortgages, require you to produce copies of your tax returns. Because your income is one of the most essential factors in loan acceptance, lenders use your ITR to confirm it.
 Income proof :The ITR receipt also serves as proof of income for self-employed professionals such as consultants, business partners, or freelancers. ITR is particularly useful for such experts who are not on the payroll of any one corporation in their business and financial operations.

Public benefits of paying income tax 

 Public infrastructure: In most regions of the country, work on transportation infrastructure, government institutions, public spaces, smart cities, and other projects is well underway. The government is able to fund infrastructure improvements with the help of the taxes that taxpayers pay.

• Social assistance programs: The government runs and often develops new public welfare initiatives to help people from all sections of the country, including health, education, housing, unemployment, and food programs. One of the key sources of funding for such programmes is income tax.

• Defense and scientific research: The latest Chandrayaan 2 mission of the Indian Space Research Organization (ISRO) has made every Indian proud. However, such space missions and scientific breakthroughs necessitate ongoing support. Similarly, tax dollars assist the government in allocating appropriate funding to maintain and strengthen our country's defense capabilities.

Taxable vs. Non-taxable Income 
Almost all types of income are considered taxable by the IRS, however a tiny number of revenue streams are not. 4 If you are a member of a religious order who has taken a poverty vow, work for an organization managed by that order, and turn up your earnings to the order, your income is non-taxable.

Similarly, the value of an employee achievement award is not taxed as long as certain conditions are met. If a loved one passes away and you receive a life insurance payment, that is also non-taxable income.

Taxable and non-taxable income are defined differently by different taxing authorities. While the IRS considers lottery winnings taxable income in the United States, the Canada Revenue Agency considers most lottery prizes and other one-time windfalls to be non-taxable.

See also
Economic reports
Personal income in the United States

References

Employment compensation
Income
National accounts